Lucani may refer to:

 Lučani, a town and municipality in the Moravica district of Serbia
FK Mladost Lučani football club
Lučani (village)
 Lucanians, an ancient people of Italy
 Donji Lučani, a village in the municipality of Kakanj, Bosnia and Herzegovina
Gornji Lučani
Glabella lucani, a species of sea snail
Hyperolius lucani, a species of frog

See also
Lucan (disambiguation)